Springhead Urban District was an urban district in the West Riding of Yorkshire in England. Established in 1895, it functioned until 1937 when it was absorbed into Saddleworth Urban District.

References 
http://discovery.nationalarchives.gov.uk/details/rd/be3cfd3c-4fac-4fc7-be63-1592f744d691

1937 disestablishments in England
Saddleworth
Urban districts of England
Districts of England created by the Local Government Act 1894
West Riding of Yorkshire
History of the Metropolitan Borough of Oldham